Amor gitano (English: Gypsy love) is a Mexican telenovela produced by Pedro Damián for Televisa in 1999. Is adapted the 1983 Argentinian telenovela Amor gitano original story by Delia González Márquez and the 1969 Puerto Rican telenovela La mujer de aquella noche original story by Olga Ruilopez.

On Monday, May 3, 1999, Canal de las Estrellas started broadcasting Amor gitano weekdays at 7:00pm, replacing Soñadoras. The last episode was broadcast on Friday, July 16, 1999 with Alma rebelde replacing it the following day.

Mariana Seoane and Mauricio Islas starred as protagonists, while Maya Mishalska, Alejandro Camacho and Nailea Norvind starred as antagonists.

Cast 
 
Mariana Seoane as Adriana Astolfi, Marquise of Astolfi, Countess of Farnesio, Countess of Minelli
Mauricio Islas as Renzo, Count of Minelli
Alejandro Camacho as Rodolfo Farnesio, Count of Farnesio
Nailea Norvind as  Isa Valenti, Marquise of Astolfi
María Rubio as Isolda
Maya Mishalska as Astrid de Marnier, Countess of Marnier, Countess of Minelli, Dowager Countess of Minelli
Raquel Olmedo as Manina
Manuel Ojeda as Pedro Minelli, Count of Minelli
María Teresa Rivas as Aya Petra
Héctor Gómez as Bernal
Roberto Palazuelos as Claudio
Alberto Estrella as Jonás
Khotan as Humberto de Astolfi, Marquis of Astolfi
Susana González as Zokka
Ana Layevska as María
Valentino Lanús as Patricio
Juan Carlos Colombo as Martín
Mario Prudom as Renán
Humberto Yañez as Danilo
Rubén Cerda as Fray Quintín
Nuria Bages as Constanza de Astolfi, Dowager Marquise of Astolfi
Alec Von Bargen as Dino
Eduardo Arroyuelo as Daniel di Scarpa
Karla Albarrán as Aya
Iván Bronstein as Baltazar
Andrea García as Lucrecia
Sherlyn as Rosalinda
Adriana Acosta as Cleopatra
Gerardo Albarrán as Bernardo Le Baun
Héctor Sánchez as Orlando
Yadira Santana as Basiliza
Enrique Borja Baena as Santiago

Awards

References

External links

1999 telenovelas
Mexican telenovelas
1999 Mexican television series debuts
1999 Mexican television series endings
Television shows set in Mexico City
Televisa telenovelas
Mexican television series based on Argentine television series
Spanish-language telenovelas